Latvian Finns are people of full or partial Latvian descent residing in Finland. In 2021, there were 3,626 people with a close Latvian background in Finland. 3,023 speak Latvian in Finland as of 2021. In 2006 there were 252 Russian speakers in Finland who were born in Latvia.

546 Latvians live in Helsinki, 400 in Vantaa, 347 in Espoo, 249 in Turku and over 100 in Mariehamn, Rauma and Salo. The highest proportion of Latvians are found in the Åland islands. In Vårdö, they make up over 8% of the population, over 5% in Föglö, 4% in Geta, 3% in Lumparland, 2% in Finström, Eckerö and Hammarland and 1% in Mariehamn, Jomala, Lemland and Saltvik.

Notable people

 Angelika Kallio (born 1972), a model
 Salomon Klass (1907–1985), a military officer
 Elviss Krastiņš (born 1994), a volleyball player
 Janis Rozentāls (1866–1916), a painter
 Schauman, a noble family
 Teuvo Tulio (1912–2000), a film director and actor
 Edgar Vaalgamaa (1912–2003), a pastor and ethnologist

See also 
 Finland–Latvia relations

Notes

References

 
Ethnic groups in Finland
Finland–Latvia relations